Robert Ferdinand Wagner II (April 20, 1910 – February 12, 1991) was an American diplomat and politician who served three terms as the mayor of New York City from 1954 through 1965. When running for his third term, he broke with the Tammany Hall leadership, ending the clubhouse's reign in city politics. He also served as United States Ambassador to Spain and in a number of other offices.

Early life and career
Wagner was born in Yorkville, Manhattan, the son of Margaret Marie (McTague) and German-born United States Senator Robert Ferdinand Wagner. He attended Taft School and graduated from Yale University in 1933, where he was on the business staff of campus humor magazine The Yale Record and became a member of Scroll and Key (as was John Lindsay, his successor as mayor).  He attended Harvard Business School and the Graduate School of International Studies in Geneva. He graduated from Yale Law School in 1937.

Wagner was a member of the New York State Assembly (New York Co., 16th D.) in 1938, 1939–40 and 1941–42. He resigned his seat on January 13, 1942, and joined the Army Air Corps to fight in World War II, where he served as an intelligence officer. After the war he served as City Tax Commissioner, Commissioner of Housing and Buildings, and Chairman of the City Planning Commission. He was Borough President of Manhattan from 1950 to 1953. He also served as delegate to numerous Democratic conventions, and was the Democratic nominee for the U.S. Senate in 1956.

Mayor
Although New York City Comptroller Lazarus Joseph usually sided in the New York City Board of Estimate with Mayor Impellitteri during the latter's term in office, Joseph supported Wagner for the Democratic nomination for mayor in the 1953 primary election, calling Wagner a "sure winner."

His nomination and election as New York City mayor in 1953 caused a rift in the Democratic Party, and instigated a long-standing feud between Eleanor Roosevelt and Carmine DeSapio, Boss of Tammany Hall.  Mrs. Roosevelt was a Wagner supporter, and DeSapio offered only reluctant support to Wagner until 1961, when Wagner ran for a third term on an anti-Tammany platform, which eventually helped end DeSapio's leadership.

During Wagner's tenure as New York City's mayor, he built public housing and schools, created the City University of New York system, established the right of collective bargaining for city employees, and barred housing discrimination based on race, creed or color. He was the first mayor to hire significant numbers of people of color in city government. His administration also saw the development of Lincoln Center and brought Shakespeare to Central Park. In the fall of 1957 after the Dodgers and Giants left New York City he appointed a commission to determine whether New York City could host another National League baseball team, eventually leading to the Mets franchise being awarded to New York City.

During his years in office, the city experienced the visit of a number of notables from around the world. In January, 1957, President Eisenhower invited King Saud to the United States to discuss strategies for resolving the Suez crisis. Wagner refused Eisenhower's request of a ticker tape parade for the King and even refused to greet him formally, stating that the Muslim ruler was anti-Jewish and anti-Catholic, all of which was "a crude appeal to the prejudices of the hyphenated voters." He did greet Queen Elizabeth II later in 1957.  He also rearranged his schedule to meet with the Little Rock Nine and give them a tour of New York City Hall.

In 1956, Wagner ran on the Democratic and Liberal tickets for U.S. Senator from New York, but was defeated by Republican Jacob K. Javits. In 1957 and 1958, Wagner served as president of the United States Conference of Mayors.

Like his father, Wagner was aligned with Tammany Hall for much of his career. However, when he sought a third term in 1961, Wagner broke with Carmine DeSapio and won the Democratic primary anyway, beginning the decline of machine politics in New York City.

By the early 1960s, Wagner became concerned about the image of New York City in preparation for the 1964 World's Fair and began a controversial campaign to rid New York City of gay bars. The city revoked the bars' liquor licenses and used undercover police officers to entrap as many homosexual men as possible.

In February 1962, Wagner quit the New York Athletic Club because it barred African Americans and Jews from becoming members.

The New York Preservation Archive Project described Wagner's contribution to preservation as "complex." While he saved Carnegie Hall from demolition in 1960, he was also mayor at the time of the controversial demolition of the original Penn Station, which began on October 28, 1963. In 1965, he signed the law that created the New York City Landmarks Preservation Commission.

In 1965, Wagner decided not to run for a fourth term as mayor. Four years later, however, he ran for mayor again, but lost the Democratic primary. In 1973, he talked with the city's five Republican county chairmen about running for Mayor as a Republican, but these negotiations collapsed.

A 1993 survey of historians, political scientists and urban experts conducted by Melvin G. Holli of the University of Illinois at Chicago ranked Wagner as the seventeenth-best American big-city mayor to have served between the years 1820 and 1993.

Ambassador
After deciding not to run for a fourth term in 1965, Wagner served as ambassador to Spain from June 1968 to March 1969. In that year, he decided to run for a fourth term but was soundly beaten by Mario Procaccino in the Democratic primary. He also made a brief run four years later, but withdrew before the primary took place. In 1978 he was appointed by Jimmy Carter to be his representative to the Vatican, where the College of Cardinals had recently elected John Paul II.

Personal life
Wagner was a Roman Catholic.

Wagner's first wife was Susan Edwards, by whom he had two sons, Robert Ferdinand Wagner III and Duncan.  Susan Wagner died of lung cancer in 1964. By all accounts, the two had a very happy marriage, and although Susan was not particularly fond of politics, she enjoyed traveling with her husband and meeting many famous people. Susan was described as optimistic, cheerful, kind, and always happy. According to his friends, Mayor Wagner was "lonely and depressed" after the death of his first wife.

He married Barbara Cavanagh in 1965. They divorced in 1971. Wagner married Phyllis Fraser, widow of Bennett Cerf, in 1975. They lived together until his death in 1991. Her five-floor townhouse at 132 East 62nd Street, designed by Denning & Fourcade, "was so magnetic that the statesman moved in."

Death and legacy
He died in Manhattan of heart failure in 1991, aged 80 while he was being treated for bladder cancer.  His funeral mass was offered by Cardinal William Wakefield Baum at St. Patrick's Cathedral, and he was buried at Calvary Cemetery in Maspeth, Queens.  "Mr. Wagner was buried beside the graves of his father, United States Senator Robert F. Wagner, and mother, Margaret, and first wife, Susan Edwards Wagner, and not far from the grave of New York's Governor Al Smith."

The Robert F. Wagner Graduate School of Public Service at New York University is named in his honor, as is the Robert F. Wagner Jr. Park in Battery Park City and the Robert F. Wagner Jr. Secondary School for Arts and Technology in Long Island City.

Wagner's papers, photographs, artifacts and other materials are housed at the New York City Municipal Archives and at La Guardia and Wagner Archives.

See also
 List of mayors of New York City
 Timeline of New York City, 1950s–1960s
 J. Raymond Jones

References

Further reading
 Flanagan, Richard M. Robert Wagner and the Rise of New York City's Plebiscitary Mayoralty: The Tamer of the Tammany Tiger (Palgrave Macmillan, 2014)
 Morris, Charles R. The cost of good intentions: New York City and the liberal experiment, 1960–1975 (1981).
 Sayre, Wallace S. and Herbert Kaufman, Governing New York City: Politics in the Metropolis (1965) 782pp
 Taylor, Clarence. "Robert Wagner, Milton Galamison and the Challenge to New York City Liberalism." Afro-Americans in New York Life and History (2007) 31#2 pp: 121.
John C. Walker,The Harlem Fox: J. Raymond Jones at Tammany 1920:1970, New York: State University  New York Press, 1989.

External links
Mayor Wagner's biography on the web site of New York City
1973 audio interview with Robert F. Wagner Jr. by Don Swaim
La Guardia and Wagner Archives/Wagner Collection

1910 births
1991 deaths
1956 United States vice-presidential candidates
20th-century American politicians
Ambassadors of the United States to Spain
American Roman Catholics
United States Army Air Forces personnel of World War II
American people of German descent
Burials at Calvary Cemetery (Queens)
Commanders Crosses of the Order of Merit of the Federal Republic of Germany
Manhattan borough presidents
Mayors of New York City
Democratic Party members of the New York State Assembly
Military personnel from New York City
People from the Upper East Side
Presidents of the United States Conference of Mayors
Taft School alumni
Yale University alumni
20th-century American diplomats